is a Japanese footballer who currently plays as a midfielder for Tokyo United.

Career

Montedio Yamagata
Hidaka made his official debut for Montedio Yamagata in the J. League Division 2, J. League Cup on 10 September 2014 against Sagan Tosu in Best Amenity Stadium in Tosu, Japan. He started and finished the match which managed to reach extra time. Hidaka and his club lost the match 1-0 due to Hiroki Bandai's late 107 minute goal after just being subbed in three minutes earlier.

Club statistics
Updated to 23 February 2017.

Honours
 Blaublitz Akita
 J3 League (1): 2017

References

External links 
 

Profile at Blaublitz Akita

1990 births
Living people
Keio University alumni
Association football people from Kanagawa Prefecture
Japanese footballers
J1 League players
J2 League players
J3 League players
Japan Football League players
Montedio Yamagata players
FC Machida Zelvia players
Blaublitz Akita players
Association football midfielders